Show! Audio Jockey was a South Korean variety show program on tvN starring Park Myeong-su, Sung Si-kyung, So Yoo-jin, Boom and 4 members from Monsta X (Wonho, Minhyuk, Yoo Ki-hyun and Lee Joo-heon). It aired on tvN starting on March 17, 2019, and aired its last episode on June 30, 2019. It was broadcast by tvN on Sundays at 18:10 (KST).

Casts 
  – Present.
  – Absent.

Synopsis 
This is a show where radio and television come together. In the show, there was a group of Audio Jockeys (AJs) who hosted individual radio programs. AJs hosted their programs in an open and movable studio. Listeners were able to listen through  and tvN's official YouTube Channel during the actual recording of the show. 
A few days after the actual recording, the audio of the different programs hosted by the AJs was released. Afterwards, the radio show was also televised to enable the audience to watch how the AJs prepared behind the scenes and hosted their individual shows during the program itself.

On 7th and 8th recording, the concept changed to visual radio where listeners could watch live on YouTube what was happening at the recording location itself.

Segments

List of Episodes

Guests

Park Myeong-su's Easy Talent

Boom Box

Sweet Salon

Sung Si-kyung by Your Side

Trot Man and Woman

Itinerant Traveller

So So Kitchen

Paldo Road Singer

Ratings 

 Ratings listed below are the individual corner ratings of Show! Audio Jockey. (Note: Individual corner ratings do not include commercial time, which regular ratings include.)

References

External links 
 Official website 
 Show! Audio Jockey Podbbang channel 

South Korean variety television shows
South Korean television shows
2019 South Korean television series debuts
TVN (South Korean TV channel) original programming
Korean-language television shows
2019 South Korean television series endings